The rivière de la Grande Coudée (in English: river of the great cub) is a tributary of the west bank of the Chaudière River which flows northward to empty onto the south bank of the St. Lawrence River. It flows in the municipalities of Saint-Hilaire-de-Dorset, Saint-Gédéon-de-Beauce and Saint-Martin, in the Beauce-Sartigan Regional County Municipality, in the administrative region of Chaudière-Appalaches, in Quebec, in Canada.

Geography 
The main neighboring watersheds of the Grande Coudée river are:
 north side: Shenley River, Roy brook, Pozer River, Chaudière River;
 east side: Petit Portage River, Chaudière River;
 south side: Petit Portage River, Ludgine River;
 west side: Ludgine River, Rivière aux Bluets.

The Grande Coudée river has its source in a swamp straddling the townships of Dorset and Gayhurst, very close (north side) of the boundary between the Beauce-Sartigan Regional County Municipality (RCM) and Le Granit Regional County Municipality (RCM).

From its source, the Grande Coudée river flows over  divided into the following segments:
  towards the north-west, until the outlet of the Oliveira lake;
  towards the north-west, collecting water from a stream in the locality "Les Fourches", until the outlet of Lac Rond;
  northeasterly, up to the confluence of the Discharge of Lac des Îles;
  northeasterly, winding up to the intermunicipal limit between Saint-Hilaire-de-Dorset and Saint-Gédéon-de-Beauce;
  northeasterly, winding up to the intermunicipal limit between Saint-Gédéon-de-Beauce and Saint-Martin;
  towards the north-east, winding up to the confluence of a stream (coming from the north-west);
  eastward, up to its confluence.

The Grande Coudée River empties on the west bank of the Chaudière River at Saint-Martin.

Toponymy 
In history, this watercourse has often been referred to as the “Grande Coulée”, especially since 1937. In other times, this river has been designated “Grande Coudée” by the inhabitants of this sector; and this name has been attested in particular by Vondenvelden and Charland, 1803, and Bouchette, 1832.

The term "flow" popularly denotes a ravine, usually having an intermittent stream. The term "cubit" reflects the geographical particularities of the course of this river. As early as 1860, pioneers settled at the Grande Coudée, i.e. at the mouth of this watercourse. A Catholic mission will be known there under the name of Grandes-Coudées.

The toponym Rivière de la Grande Coudée was made official on October 19, 1990, at the Commission de toponymie du Québec.

See also 

 List of rivers of Quebec

References 

Rivers of Chaudière-Appalaches